Into My Life is a studio album by jazz trumpeter Chet Baker and the Carmel Strings recorded in 1966 and released on the World Pacific label.

Reception

Allmusic rated the album with 3 stars.

Track listing
 "A Man and a Woman (Un Homme et une Femme)" (Francis Lai) - 2:10
 "Guantanamera" (Joseíto Fernández) - 3:05
 "I've Got My Love to Keep Me Warm" (Irving Berlin) - 3:04
 "The Ballad of the Sad Young Men" (Jay Landesman, Fran Landesman, Thomas Wolf) - 4:09
 "Here, There and Everywhere" (John Lennon, Paul McCartney) - 2:45
 "Cherry Pink (and Apple Blossom White)" (Louis Guglielmi, Mack David) - 2:50
 "Serenata" (Mitchell Parish, Leroy Anderson) - 1:50
 "More and More Amor" (Sol Lake) - 2:59
 "All" - 2:56
 "If He Walked Into My Life" (Jerry Herman) - 4:03
 "Trains and Boats and Planes" (Burt Bacharach, Hal David) - 2:22
 "Got to Get You Into My Life" (Lennon, McCartney) - 2:15

Personnel
Chet Baker - flugelhorn
The Carmel Strings
Harry Betts - arranger, conductor

References 

1966 albums
Chet Baker albums
Pacific Jazz Records albums